Kishio is a Japanese surname. Notable people with the surname include:

, Japanese voice actor, singer and narrator
, Japanese scientist

Notable people with the name include:

, Japanese sculptor and installation artist
, Japanese swimmer

Japanese-language surnames
Japanese masculine given names